Oscar Bielaski (March 21, 1847 – November 8, 1911) was an American right fielder and the first Polish-American to play Major League Baseball, playing from 1872 until 1876. His father, Alexander Bielaski, a captain in the Union army, died at the Battle of Belmont.  A. Bruce Bielaski, head of the Bureau of Investigation, and his sister, Ruth Shipley, head of the State Department's Passport Division, were first cousins of Oscar.  Oscar learned to play baseball while enlisted in the Union Army as a drummer.

Oscar Bielaski was inducted in the National Polish-American Sports Hall of Fame in 2005.

Oscar was born in Washington, D.C., and died there, at the age of 64.  He is interred at Arlington National Cemetery in Arlington, Virginia.

References

External links

 
 National Polish-American Sports HOF profile

American people of Polish descent
19th-century baseball players
Baseball players from Washington, D.C.
Washington Nationals (NA) players
Washington Blue Legs players
Baltimore Canaries players
Chicago White Stockings players
Major League Baseball right fielders
Burials at Arlington National Cemetery
1847 births
1911 deaths
Washington Nationals (minor league) players
Nationals of Washington players
Union Army soldiers